Jiuxian Town, is a town in the Yanqing District of Beijing. It shares border with Houcheng Town in its north, Xiangying Township and Yongning Town in its east, Shenjiaying Town in its south, and Zhangshanying Town in its west. In 2020, it was home to 17,676 inhabitants.

The name Jiuxian is referring to the town's past status as the county center of Yanqing. It used to be the county seat of Jinshan County (缙山, later renamed to Longqing County and then Yanqing County) until 1316.

Geography 
Jiuxian Town is bounded by a collection of mountains along its northern boundary with Houcheng, Hebei. Bayu Road passes through the southeast of the town.

History

Administrative divisions 
So far in 2021, Jiuxian Town covers 23 subdivisions, including 1 community and 22 villages. They are listed as follows:

Landmark 

 Longqing Gorge

See also 

 List of township-level divisions of Beijing

References

Yanqing District
Towns in Beijing